The 2022 World Senior Curling Championships was held from April 23 to 30 at the Curling Club Trois-Chêne in the Geneva Sous-Moulin Sports Center in Thônex, a suburb of Geneva, Switzerland. The event was held alongside the 2022 World Mixed Doubles Curling Championship.

Medallists

Men

Teams

The teams are listed as follows:

Round-robin standings
Final round-robin standings

Round-robin results

All draw times are listed in Central European Summer Time (UTC+02:00).

Draw 1
Saturday, April 23, 8:00

Draw 2
Saturday, April 23, 12:00

Draw 3
Saturday, April 23, 16:00

Draw 4
Saturday, April 23, 20:00

Draw 5
Sunday, April 24, 9:00

Draw 6
Sunday, April 24, 14:00

Draw 7
Sunday, April 24, 19:00

Draw 8
Monday, April 25, 8:00

Draw 9
Monday, April 25, 12:00

Draw 10
Monday, April 25, 16:00

Draw 11
Monday, April 25, 20:00

Draw 12
Tuesday, April 26, 8:00

Draw 13
Tuesday, April 26, 12:00

Draw 14
Tuesday, April 26, 16:00

Draw 15
Tuesday, April 26, 20:00

Draw 17
Wednesday, April 27, 12:00

Draw 18
Wednesday, April 27, 16:00

Draw 19
Wednesday, April 27, 20:00

Draw 20
Thursday, April 28, 8:00

Draw 21
Thursday, April 28, 12:00

Draw 22
Thursday, April 28, 16:00

Draw 23
Thursday, April 28, 20:00

Playoffs

Quarterfinals
Friday, April 29, 9:00

Semifinals
Friday, April 29, 19:00

Bronze medal game
Saturday, April 30, 10:30

Gold medal game
Saturday, April 30, 10:30

Final standings

Women

Teams

The teams are listed as follows:

{| class=wikitable
|-
!width=250|
!width=250|
!width=250|
!width=250|
!width=250|
|-
|
Skip: Sherry Anderson
Third: Patty Hersikorn
Second: Brenda Goertzen
Lead: Anita Silvernagle
Alternate: Denise Hersikorn
|
Fourth: Katerina Zapletalová
Skip: Ivana Bartáková
Second: Helena Kramska
Lead: Hana Velova
Alternate: Zuzana Sommerová
|
Fourth: Trine Qvist
Third: Anni Gustavussen
Second: Gitte Soelvsten
Skip: Linette Henningsen
|
Skip: Angela Wilcox
Third: Judith Dixon
Second: Helen Forbes
Lead: Deborah Higgins
Alternate: Joan Reed
|
Skip: Elina Virtaala
Third: Janina Lindström
Second: Tiina Julkunen
Lead: Riikka Louhivuori
|-
!width=250|
!width=250|
!width=250|
!width=250|
!width=250|
|-
|
Skip: Dale Sinclair
Third: Louise Kerr
Second: Bernie Gillett
Lead: Clare McCormick
|
Fourth: Grazia Ferrero
Skip: Lucilla Macchiati
Second: Daniela Faure-Rolland
Lead: Monica Rossetto
Alternate: Cristina Durando
|
Skip: Gunte Millere
Third: Dace Zīle
Second: Elēna Kāpostiņa
Lead: Inga Apmane
|
Fourth: Rasa Veronika Jasaitienė
Skip: Gaiva Valatkienė
Second: Jolanta Šulinskienė
Lead: Eglė Čepulytė
|
Fourth: Mairi Milne
Skip: Edith Hazard
Second: Wendy Johnston
Lead: Katie Loudon
Alternate: Jackie Lockhart
|-
!width=250|
!width=250|
!width=250|
!width=250|
!width=250|
|-
|
Fourth: Camilla Noréen
Skip: Helena Klange
Second: Helene Lyxell
Lead: Anna Klange Wikström
Alternate: Monika Wranå
|
Skip: Cristina Lestander
Third: Sandra Born
Second: Silvia Gygax
Lead: Christina Gartenmann
Alternate: Karin Durtschi|
Skip: Margie Smith
Third: Ann Swisshelm
Second: Shelly Kosal
Lead: Shelley Dropkin
|
|
|}

Round-robin standingsFinal round-robin standingsRound-robin results

All draw times are listed in Central European Summer Time (UTC+02:00).

Draw 1Saturday, April 23, 8:00Draw 2Saturday, April 23, 12:00Draw 3Saturday, April 23, 16:00Draw 4Saturday, April 23, 20:00Draw 6Sunday, April 24, 14:00Draw 7Sunday, April 24, 19:00Draw 9Monday, April 25, 12:00Draw 11Monday, April 25, 20:00Draw 12Tuesday, April 26, 8:00Draw 13Tuesday, April 26, 12:00Draw 14Tuesday, April 26, 16:00Draw 16Wednesday, April 27, 8:00Draw 17Wednesday, April 27, 12:00Draw 18Wednesday, April 27, 16:00Draw 20Thursday, April 28, 8:00Draw 21Thursday, April 28, 12:00Draw 22Thursday, April 28, 16:00Draw 23Thursday, April 28, 20:00Playoffs

QuarterfinalsFriday, April 29, 13:00SemifinalsFriday, April 29, 19:00Bronze medal gameSaturday, April 30, 10:30Gold medal gameSaturday, April 30, 10:30''

Final standings

References

External links

World Senior Curling Championships
World Senior Curling Championships
World Senior Curling
World Senior Curling Championships
Sports competitions in Geneva
International curling competitions hosted by Switzerland
21st century in Geneva